Tom Gormley (29 July 1916 – 1984) was a politician in Northern Ireland, and a member of the Northern Ireland  parliament for Mid Tyrone from 1962 until its suspension in 1972.

Born in Claudy, Gormley became a farmer before following his brother Paddy into politics.  He was elected to Strabane Rural District Council in 1947, and to Tyrone County Council in 1950.

At the 1958 Northern Ireland general election, Gormley stood as an Independent Farmers' Candidate on a nationalist platform in Mid Tyrone, coming second.  At the 1962 election, he was elected there for the official Nationalist Party.  With his brother, he represented the liberal tendency in the party.

In November 1969, Gormley resigned to sit as an Independent Nationalist, and in 1972, he joined the Alliance Party of Northern Ireland (APNI).  He stood unsuccessfully in Mid Ulster for APNI at the 1973 Northern Ireland Assembly election, but was elected to Strabane District Council, on which he served until 1977.

References

1916 births
1984 deaths
Politicians from County Londonderry
Members of Strabane District Council
Members of Tyrone County Council
Alliance Party of Northern Ireland members of the House of Commons of Northern Ireland
Members of the House of Commons of Northern Ireland 1962–1965
Members of the House of Commons of Northern Ireland 1965–1969
Members of the House of Commons of Northern Ireland 1969–1973
Nationalist Party (Ireland) members of the House of Commons of Northern Ireland
Independent members of the House of Commons of Northern Ireland
Members of the House of Commons of Northern Ireland for County Tyrone constituencies
Alliance Party of Northern Ireland councillors